Joseph Hutcheson may refer to:

 Joseph Chappell Hutcheson (1842–1924), Texas politician and United States Representative 
 Joseph Chappell Hutcheson Jr. (1879–1973), United States federal judge and son of the Texas Representative
 Joseph Collier Hutcheson (1906–1972), Virginia state senator
 Joe Hutcheson (1905–1993), baseball player

See also
 Joseph Hutchinson (disambiguation)